Kisantu, is a town in the western Democratic Republic of Congo, lying south west of Kinshasa, on the Inkisi River. It is known for its large cathedral and for its botanical gardens, which include an arboretum of indigenous trees.

Location
Kisantu is located in Kongo Central Province, along the eastern bank of the Inkisi River, as it flows northwards to empty into the Congo River. On the western bank of the river, is the settlement called Inkisi. Sometimes the metropolitan area is referred to as Inkisi-Kisantu.

The geographical coordinates of the town are: 05°07'44.0"S, 15°05'05.0"E (Latitude:-5.128889; Longitude:15.084722).

Overview
One of the tourist attractions to he town is the Kisantu Botanical Gardens (French: Jardin Botanique de Kisantu (KISA)).
The were established in 1990 by Father Justin Gillet, a Jesuit priest. Between 2004 and 2008, the gardens were rehabilitated with "the support of the European Union and the National Botanic Garden of Belgium".

The gardens attract researchers, botanists, naturalists, school children and ordinary tourists from inside and outside the Democratic Republic of the Congo.

Population
As of October 2022, the article in this reference estimated the population of Kisantu Town at approximately 78,000 people.

Transport 
Kisantu is served by a station on the national railway system. It also has an airport. A good national road (N1), leads north to Kinshasa and southwest to he port city of Matadi.

Prominent people
The legendary DR Congolese saxophonist, composer, bandleader, producer, record label founder, and music-business executive, Verckys Kiamuangana Mateta (19 May 1944 – 13 October 2022), was born in Kisantu.

See also 

 Railway stations in DRCongo

References

External links
 Prevalence of Schistosoma mansoni Infection in Four Health Areas of Kisantu Health Zone, Democratic Republic of the Congo by R. Khonde Kumbu, Mbanzulu Makola, and Lu Bin. Hindawi Journal: Volume 2016 | Article ID 6596095 | https://doi.org/10.1155/2016/6596095

 
Populated places in Kongo Central